The Turkish construction and contracting industry is a big part of the economy: but it has been accused of poor quality due to corruption, causing many deaths in earthquakes.

To improve energy efficiency of buildings it has been suggested that green buildings should be defined.

Turkish contracting in the international market

During the periods in which investments slowed down in the public and private sectors, foreign contracting services gained importance. The shrinking of the economy in Turkey and the bottleneck in the construction sector resulting from it, has forced construction companies to concentrate more on business abroad.

The opening of the Turkish contractors to foreign markets started at the beginning of the 1970s. The first country to which Turkish contractors exported their services was Libya, where they started their projects by importing the necessary technology from European countries.

Later on, the growing Turkish contracting services expanded to other foreign markets such as Iraq, Jordan, Saudi Arabia, Kuwait, the United Arab Emirates, Yemen and Iran. Particularly during the 1970s, 90% of the expatriate works undertaken were realized in Arab countries. Since the beginning of the 1980s, the Turkish Contractors have oriented themselves more towards the former Soviet Union countries. In the 1990s, due to the economic depression and the political uncertainties in the Middle Eastern and North African countries, the Turkish Contractors have focused predominantly on the Commonwealth of Independent States, Eastern Europe and Asian countries. In this framework, they have undertaken important projects in the Russian Federation, Ukraine, the Caucasus, the Central Asian Republics, Germany, Pakistan and the Far East.

The total volume of work undertaken by Turkish Contractors has reached 110 billion US Dollars. The Turkish Contractors Association (TCA) currently has 139 members from Turkeys main contracting companies. 90% of the members of TCA is composed of engineers and architects. These are responsible for the realisation of 70% of domestic construction works and 80% of over 4,200 projects undertaken in 69 countries.

Timeline

The works of Turkish contractors can be evaluated over three decades plus the period during 2000–2005.

1972–1979
Most of the works undertaken during this period were in North Africa and especially in Libya (72.54%) and later on, in Saudi Arabia (15.44%), Iraq (7.25%), Kuwait (4.71%), Greece (0.06%) and Iran (0.01%).

The most important field of activity in this period was housing (32.14%), followed by harbours (18.11%), road/ bridge/ tunnel works (11.67%) and urban infrastructure projects (8.19%).

1980–1989
Most of the works undertaken during the second decade were realized in Libya again, despite a relative decrease in proportion (55.05%). Saudi Arabia (24.38%) and Iraq (11.16%) were ranked respectively second and third thus maintaining the position they had occupied during the first decade. The emergence of the former Soviet Union was a new development that occurred during this period (3.50%). Other countries in which Turkish contractors started working were Jordan, Yemen, Iran, the USA, Tunisia, the United Arab Emirates, Kuwait and the Turkish Republic of Northern Cyprus.

During this period, housing activities (38.90%) and urban infrastructure projects (17.52%) increased and were followed by road/ bridge/ tunnel (6.69%) and agricultural projects (6.33%).

1990–1999
In the third decade, the trend changed completely. While the share of the Russian Federation increased to (36.19%), Libya's share decreased drastically to (11.19%). Libya was followed by Pakistan (6.92%) and Turkmenistan (6.67%). Together, the works undertaken in the former Soviet Union countries amounted to 61%. The differentiation of the countries in which new projects were undertaken was a novel development characteristic of this decade. Pakistan (6.92%), Turkmenistan (6.67%), Kazakhstan (6.55%), Uzbekistan (4.29%), Bulgaria (2.79%), the USA (2.69%), Azerbaijan (2.30%) and Croatia (1.86%) emerged as new markets. Other important developments were the considerable decrease in the proportion of works in Saudi Arabia (3.44%) and the disappearance of Iraq from the scene. The "other" category comprised 33 countries with a proportion of 8%.

Despite a decrease in the proportion of housing works (23.89%), it remained the first ranking activity. However, this did not mean a decrease in housing works in terms of value. The value of the housing projects undertaken during this period was also high. Housing was followed by road/ bridge/ tunnel works (12.84%), industrial facilities (9.65%) and commercial centers (8.13%).

The highest proportion of the projects undertaken during this period was in the Russian Federation and the other former Soviet Union countries.

2000–2007

The period after the year 2000 is a period where markets showed even more differentiation and where there was specialization in certain types of projects. The number of countries, in which Turkish contractors worked, increased considerably and that caused the percentage of work in each country to decrease relatively. Nevertheless, the Russian Federation maintained the first rank (14.66%) and was followed by Romania (11.46%) and Kazakhstan (9.55%). The interesting developments in this period are, apart from Romania, the emergence of the United Arab Emirates (7.75%), Afghanistan (5.34%), Ireland (4.66%), Qatar (3.33%), Algeria and Morocco as new markets. After the interventions that took place in Afghanistan and Iraq, the rebuilding activities in these countries were closely followed by TCA member companies, just as it was in the rest of the world.

When the types of work undertaken during this period are considered, road/bridge/tunnel works occupy the first rank (24.47%), followed by industrial facilities (14.52%), airports (8.33%), social and cultural facilities (6.54%) and housing (6.08%).

The total value of work undertaken amounted to 5.4 billion US Dollars in 2004,9.3 billion US Dollars in 2005, 15.9 billion US Dollars in 2006 and 19.5 billion US Dollars in 2007.

Earthquakes

See also
Baku–Tbilisi–Ceyhan pipeline
Kashagan Field
Samsun-Ceyhan Pipeline

References

External links
 Undersecretariat of the Prime Ministry for Foreign Trade - International Contracting and Technical Consultancy Department
 Foreign Economic Relations Board

 
Economy of Turkey
Turkish industries